Koedoe, subtitled African Protected Area Conservation and Science, is a peer-reviewed open access scientific journal covering biology, ecology, and biodiversity conservation in Africa. It was established in 1958. Koedoe is Afrikaans for Kudu.

Abstracting and indexing 
For full information visit the journal website link http://koedoe.co.za/index.php/koedoe/pages/view/about#7

External links

 

Publications established in 1958
English-language journals
Open access journals
Ecology journals
Conservation biology